The 2007 St Edmundsbury Borough Council election took place on 3 May 2007 to elect members of St Edmundsbury Borough Council in England. This was on the same day as other local elections.

Summary

|}

References

2007 English local elections
May 2007 events in the United Kingdom
2007
2000s in Suffolk